Indonesian Idol Junior, is a singing competition, same as the other Idol junior shows in other countries, such as Brazil, Germany, Puerto Rico and India. The show aired from 4 October 2014 until 14 December 2018.

Presenter

Current 
 Daniel Mananta

Former 
 Arie Untung (season 1)
 Bastian Steel (season 1)
 Tarra Budiman (season 2)
 Alifa (season 2)

Judges

Current 
 Rayi Putra
 Rizky Febian 
 Maia Estianty 
 Rossa

Former 
 Daniel Mananta (season 1–2)
 Regina Ivanova (season 1)
 Titi DJ (season 1)
 Irvanat (season 1)
 Vidi Aldiano (season 2)
 Nola AB Three (season 2)

Result

Season 1

Season 2

Season 3

External links
Official website 

Indonesian reality television series
Indonesian music television series
2014 Indonesian television series debuts
Junior
Indonesian television series based on British television series